Frank Herne (born 31 October 1989) is a South African rugby union player who last played for the  in the Currie Cup and in the Rugby Challenge. He usually plays the position of Hooker.

Herne is a product of Grey College and featured for the South African Schools Academy side in 2007.  He played in the 2009 FNB Varsity Cup for Shimlas and was part of the  squad for the 2010 Vodacom Cup.

In 2013, Herne was included in a South Africa President's XV team that played in the 2013 IRB Tbilisi Cup and won the tournament after winning all three matches.

Herne was a member of the Pumas side that won the Vodacom Cup for the first time in 2015, beating  24–7 in the final. Herne made just one appearances during the season, coming on as a replacement in the final.

References

1989 births
Living people
People from Ficksburg
South African rugby union players
Eastern Province Elephants players
Pumas (Currie Cup) players
Rugby union hookers
Alumni of Grey College, Bloemfontein
Rugby union players from the Free State (province)